Paul Lespagne Delisse (12 July 1817 – 8 September 1888) was a 19th-century French classical trombonist.

Born in Longwy, département Meurthe et Moselle, he became a soloist at the Opéra-Comique and the Orchestre de la Société des Concerts du Conservatoire. From 1871 to 1888 he was a trombone professor at the Conservatoire de Paris in succession to Antoine Dieppo. Delisse transcribed numerous works by classical and contemporary composers for trombone and piano.

He died in Paris.

References

External links
 Paul Delisse on BnF Data
 Paul Lespagne Delisse on Gallica

1817 births
1888 deaths
19th-century French musicians
19th-century male musicians
Academic staff of the Conservatoire de Paris
French classical trombonists
Male trombonists
People from Longwy
19th-century classical trombonists